Ornella Soledad Santana (born 17 September 1990) is an Argentine basketball player for CD ZAMARAT and the Argentina women's national basketball team.

She defended Argentina at the 2018 FIBA Women's Basketball World Cup.

References

External links

1990 births
Living people
Argentine expatriate basketball people in Spain
Argentine expatriate sportspeople in Brazil
Argentine women's basketball players
Basketball players at the 2019 Pan American Games
Basketball players from Buenos Aires
Power forwards (basketball)
Pan American Games competitors for Argentina